Mikheil Kurdiani (1 January 1954, Tbilisi – 31 October 2010, Tbilisi) was a Georgian philologist, linguist, writer, poet and translator. He was a head man of the Rustaveli Society.

Biography 
In 1976 he graduated from Tbilisi State University having successfully studied philology. In 2001 he earned a master's degree at Nikoloz Muskhelishvili Technical University in the faculty of applied mathematics and mathematical linguistics.

He was founder of Ilia Chavchavadze Society. He lectured at Tbilisi State University and Akaki Tsereteli State University. He was a member of Union of Georgian writers. Mikheil has published more than 200 scientific papers.  A bibliography his works is published, his photo on p. 7, then a listing in Georgian, p. 27 ff in English.

References 
 Bibliography

Writers from Georgia (country)
Male poets from Georgia (country)
1954 births
2010 deaths
20th-century poets from Georgia (country)
Translators from Georgia (country)
20th-century male writers
20th-century translators